Teri Meri Jodi is a Pakistani television romantic comedy which aired on Geo Entertainment. First episode was aired on 22 December 2015. Serial is produced by Babar Javed in collaboration with Zee TV Production. It is a love story of a Gujrati girl Jiya and Punjabi man Kabeer.

Cast
Sami Khan
Almas Fidai
Adeel Wadia
Maham Amir
Ali Ansari
Hina Khawaja Bayat
Zaheen Tahira
Parminder Gill
Shazia Gohar
Hiba Bukhari
Shehnaz Pervaiz as Almas's mother
Aftab Alam
Ashraf Khan
Nadia Kanwal
Hira Hussain
 Farah Nadir
Faisal Qazi
Kaif Ghaznavi
Sonia Rao
Hamid Malik
Iqra Shahid
Usman Mazhar
Shahzaib Khwaja
Erum Bashir
Fawad Khan
Umar Sultan
Abyan Chaudhry
Husna Amaze

Controversy
The drama was scheduled to air on Zee Zindagi in India in October 2016, but following the aftermath of the 2016 Uri attack, the channel owner decided to ban Pakistani content on the channel so the serial was  postponed.

References

Pakistani romance television series